MHG or mhg may refer to:

Organisations
 Moscow Helsinki Group, a human rights nisation in Russia
 Morgans Hotel Group, an operator of hotels
 Meredian Holdings Group, a biopolymer manufacturer

Other uses
 Middle High German, a period in the history of the German language
 Mannheim City Airport (IATA code), Germany
 Marrgu language (ISO 639 code), an extinct Aboriginal language
 Monster Hunter Generations

See also
 Mars Hill Graduate School (MHGS), the former name of the Seattle School of Theology & Psychology, US